Subedar Gurpreet Singh (born 19 December 1987) is an Indian sports shooter. He won two gold medals in shooting events at the 2010 Commonwealth Games held in India. He paired up with Vijay Kumar to win a gold in the Men's 25m Rapid Fire Pistol (Pairs) on 7 October 2010. On the same day, he and Omkar Singh won another gold medal in the Men's 10m Air Pistol (Pairs). He also won an individual bronze in Men's 25m rapid fire pistol (Singles) at the event.

References

External links

Indian male sport shooters
Shooters at the 2010 Commonwealth Games
Commonwealth Games gold medallists for India
Living people
People from Tarn Taran Sahib
Indian Army personnel
Asian Games medalists in shooting
Shooters at the 2010 Asian Games
Shooters at the 2014 Asian Games
Olympic shooters of India
Shooters at the 2016 Summer Olympics
Commonwealth Games medallists in shooting
Sport shooters from Punjab, India
Asian Games silver medalists for India
Medalists at the 2014 Asian Games
ISSF pistol shooters
1987 births
South Asian Games medalists in shooting
Recipients of the Arjuna Award
21st-century Indian people
Medallists at the 2010 Commonwealth Games